Amman Valley Hospital is a community hospital in Ammanford, Wales. It is managed by the Hywel Dda University Health Board.

History
The hospital was established as the Amman Valley Cottage Hospital in 1936. The hospital joined the National Health Service in 1948 and benefited from a new day care unit in 1995 and a new ophthalmology day case theatre in 2001.

References

NHS hospitals in Wales
Hospitals in Carmarthenshire
Hospitals established in 1936
Hospital buildings completed in 1936
Hywel Dda University Health Board